"Lovin' Things" is a 1968 song recorded by Scottish group The Marmalade, later covered by The Grass Roots.  The song was written by Artie Schroeck and Jet Loring. It was the band's first successful single release, reaching number six on the UK singles chart. Their version was not, however, released in North America.

Grass Roots cover

"Lovin' Things" was released in 1968 by Bobby Rydell then covered the following year by The Grass Roots.  It was the lead single from their album of the same name.  The song became a modest hit in both Canada and the United States.

Chart performance
(The Marmalade)

Weekly charts

Year-end charts

(The Grass Roots)

Other versions
 "Lovin' Things" was first released by the writer, Artie Schroeck on Columbia Records in early 1967.
 Bobby Rydell did a version of the song in 1967.  It was released as the B-side of "That's What I Call Livin'," a non-charting single.  He performed "Lovin' Things" on the Dick Clark ABC-TV Saturday-afternoon program, American Bandstand on February 28, 1970.
 Keith Mansfield Orchestra, on his 1968 album All You Need Is Keith Mansfield
 December's Children, in 1968
 Petula Clark, on her 1969 album Portrait of Petula
 The Ventures, on their 1969 gold album Hawaii Five-O

References

External links
 Lyrics of this song
 
 

Marmalade (band) songs
The Grass Roots songs
Petula Clark songs
The Ventures songs
1967 songs
1968 singles
1969 singles
CBS Records singles
ABC Records singles
Songs written by Artie Schroeck
Song recordings produced by Mike Smith (British record producer)